Pierre Gustave Adolphe Gusman, born Gusmand (6 December 1862, Paris18 December 1941, Grosrouvre) was a French engraver, illustrator, and art historian, specializing in wood engraving techniques and Roman architecture.

Biography 
He was born to the engraver, and his wife, Marie Émilie née Cleftie. He graduated from the École Nationale Supérieure des Beaux-Arts, and held his first exhibition at the Salon in 1885. Various grants allowed to make visits to Italy, between 1894 and 1902. He was awarded the Charles-Blanc Prize in 1900, for his work on Pompeii, and again in 1904, for his work on the Villa Jovis.

Later, he joined the École de Rambouillet, founded in 1905 by a community of artists; including Julien Tinayre and Pierre Emile Lelong In 1911, he was one of the co-founders of the "" (SGBO), which was dissolved in 1935. 

He was the author of numerous essays on the decorative arts of ancient Rome, and contributed regularly to several publications such as Nouvel Imagier and Le Livre et l'estampe. He also served as the Director for the collection "Documents d'art", belonging to the editor, . From 1922 to 1931, he managed one of Morancés magazines, issued quarterly. During this time, in 1925, he was named a Knight in the Legion of Honor.

References

Further reading 
 Paul-Joseph Angoulvent, "Pierre Gusman, peintre-graveur et historien d'art", In: Byblis, Autumn 1923, pg.85 
 Philippe Le Stum, La Gravure sur Bois en Bretagne, 1850-2000, Coop Breizh, 2018

External links 

 Hélène Dessales, "GUSMAND, dit GUSMAN, Pierre", In: Dictionnaire critique des Historiens de l'art, INHA, 2013 (Online)



1862 births
1941 deaths
French art historians
French engravers
Recipients of the Legion of Honour
Writers from Paris